Diamond Peak is a prominent mountain summit in the Green River Basin of the U.S. state of Colorado.

Mountain
Diamond Peak was the scene of a diamond salting scheme known as the Diamond hoax of 1872.  It was solved by Clarence King, the noted geologist and surveyor.

There are two other "Diamond Peaks" in Colorado, one in Routt County and the other in Jackson County.

See also

List of Colorado mountain ranges
List of Colorado mountain summits
List of Colorado fourteeners
List of Colorado 4000 meter prominent summits
List of the most prominent summits of Colorado
List of Colorado county high points

References

External links

Mountains of Colorado
Mountains of Moffat County, Colorado
North American 2000 m summits